Guddattu Sri Vinayaka Temple is located at Kundapura, Udupi District in the state of Karnataka, India. It is a Hindu temple dedicated to god Ganapathy,  also called Jaladhivasa GanapathyTemple, It is the only Jaladhivasa Ganapathi temple in India. Lord Ganesha’s three-foot idol is believed to have emerged from the rock. Aayira Koda Seva, Tailabhyanjana, Panchamrutha and Rudrabhisheka are performed in the temple everyday.

The temple belongs to Guddattu Adiga family ancestry.

See also
Ganesha Temple, Idagunji
Ganesha Temple, Morgaon
List of Ganesha temples

References

External links
Official website

Ganesha temples
Hindu temples in Udupi district